Dany Saputra (born 1 January 1991) is an Indonesian professional footballer who plays as a left back for Liga 1 club Persik Kediri.

Club career

Persija Jakarta
At the end of December 2013, he was officially recruited by Persija Jakarta after undergoing a trial match. He made his league debut on 8 May 2014 in an Old Indonesia derby against Persib Bandung at the Jalak Harupat Stadium, Bandung.

Persebaya Surabaya
In December 2014, Dany signed with Persebaya Surabaya for the 2015 Indonesia Super League. He made his league debut on 5 April 2015 in a 1–0 win against Mitra Kukar at the Gelora Bung Tomo Stadium, Surabaya. Dany only made 2 appearances for the club because this season was officially discontinued by PSSI on 2 May 2015 due to a ban by Imam Nahrawi, Minister of Youth and Sports Affairs, against PSSI to run any football competition.

Surabaya United / Bhayangkara
In 2016, Dany signed for a new club from Indonesian National Police Surabaya United. He made his official league debut on 20 April 2017 in a 2–1 win against Badak Lampung at the Gelora Bung Tomo Stadium, Surabaya.

Return to Persija Jakarta
On 19 December 2017, Dany decided to re-join former club Persija Jakarta, signing a two-year contract. Dany made his league debut in a 0–0 draw against Bhayangkara on 23 March 2018.

Loan to Bhayangkara
On 9 July 2018, Dany decided to re-join Bhayangkara on loan from Persija Jakarta for the 2018 season. Dany made his league debut for Bhayangkara on 21 July 2018 in a 2–3 away win against Bali United at the Kapten I Wayan Dipta Stadium, Gianyar.

Return to Persija Jakarta
After his loan ended with Bhayangkara and he returned to Persija Jakarta, the injury that happened to him made him not perform optimally with Bhayangkara. On 22 June 2019, Dany made his new league season debut for Persija in a 0–0 away draw against Persela Lamongan at the Surajaya Stadium, Lamongan

Persik Kediri
He was signed for Persik Kediri to play in Liga 1 in the 2020 season. This season was suspended on 27 March 2020 due to the COVID-19 pandemic. The season was abandoned and was declared void on 20 January 2021.

International career
In 2014, Dany Saputra represented the Indonesia U-23, in the 2014 Asian Games.

Honours

Club
Bhayangkara
 Liga 1: 2017
Persija Jakarta
 Indonesia President's Cup: 2018

References

External links 
 
 Dany Saputra at Liga Indonesia

1991 births
Living people
Indonesian footballers
Liga 1 (Indonesia) players
Indonesian Premier Division players
Persebaya Surabaya players
PS Mojokerto Putra players
Persija Jakarta players
Bhayangkara F.C. players
Persik Kediri players
Association football defenders
Footballers at the 2014 Asian Games
Asian Games competitors for Indonesia
People from Kediri (city)
Sportspeople from East Java